Wujek Ridge is a rock ridge trending north–south and marking the east extent of Davis Valley in the Dufek Massif, Pensacola Mountains. Named by Advisory Committee on Antarctic Names (US-ACAN) in 1979 after CWO Stanley J. Wujek, USA, helicopter pilot of the Army Aviation Detachment which supported the United States Geological Survey (USGS) Pensacola Mountains survey, 1965–66.

Ridges of Queen Elizabeth Land